Problems of the following type, and their solution techniques, were first studied in the 18th century, and the general topic became known as geometric probability.

 (Buffon's needle) What is the chance that a needle dropped randomly onto a floor marked with equally spaced parallel lines will cross one of the lines?
 What is the mean length of a random chord of a unit circle? (cf. Bertrand's paradox).
 What is the chance that three random points in the plane form an acute (rather than obtuse) triangle?
 What is the mean area of the polygonal regions formed when randomly oriented lines are spread over the plane?

For mathematical development see the concise monograph by Solomon.

Since the late 20th century, the topic has split into two topics with different emphases.  Integral geometry sprang from the principle that the mathematically natural probability models are those that are invariant under certain transformation groups.  This topic emphasises systematic development of formulas for calculating expected values associated with the geometric 
objects derived from random points, and can in part be viewed as a sophisticated branch of multivariate calculus.  Stochastic geometry emphasises the random geometrical objects themselves.  For instance: different models for random lines or for random tessellations of the plane; random sets formed by making points of a spatial Poisson process be (say) centers of discs.

See also 

 Wendel's theorem

References 

Daniel A. Klain, Gian-Carlo Rota - Introduction to Geometric Probability.
Maurice G. Kendall, Patrick A. P. Moran - Geometrical Probability.
Eugene Seneta, Karen Hunger Parshall, François Jongmans - Nineteenth-Century Developments in Geometric Probability: J. J. Sylvester, M. W. Crofton, J.-É. Barbier, and J. Bertrand

Fields of geometry
Probability theory